Towns County High School is a public high school in Hiawassee, Georgia. It is part of the Towns County School District. The school is at 1400 U.S. Route 76. The school colors are blue and white and the Indians are the school's mascot. The school district is predominantly white, the high school has a higher than state average graduation rate and a lower than state average college preparedness and advanced courses participation rate.

Jerry Anthony Taylor, Towns County's historian, taught at the school for 32 years. The school hosts the annual Battle of the States basketball tournament.

See also
Hiawassee High School
Young Harris Institute

References

Public high schools in Georgia (U.S. state)
Education in Towns County, Georgia